Terhi Uusi-Luomalahti (born 20 February 1974) is a Finnish former football defender who played for HJK Helsinki, among other teams, in the Naisten Liiga. She was a member of the Finnish national team for thirteen years, taking part in the 2005 European Championship.

Titles
 7 Finnish Leagues (1995 — 2001)
 4 Finnish Cups (1998 — 2000, 2002)

References

1974 births
Living people
Finnish women's footballers
Finland women's international footballers
Helsingin Jalkapalloklubi (women) players
Kansallinen Liiga players
People from Järvenpää
Women's association football defenders
Järvenpään Palloseura players